Sylvia Beth Bashevkin,  (born 1954) is Canadian academic and writer known for her research in the field of women and politics.

Career

Bashevkin is a professor in the Department of Political Science in the University of Toronto Faculty of Arts and Science. From 2005 to 2011, she was Principal of University College, Toronto. She is a senior fellow of Massey College, Toronto.

In 2001, she was elected a Fellow of the Royal Society of Canada. In 2005, Bashevkin was named Canada's Most Powerful Women: Top 100 Award by the Women's Executive Network. Later in 2014, she was awarded the Royal Society of Canada's Ursula Franklin Award in Gender Studies. That same year, she was also the recipient of the  Mildred A. Schwartz Lifetime Achievement Award from the American Political Science Association.

In 2017, Bashevkin published an article titled "Listening to women leaders: Feminist narratives among US foreign policy" which was subsequently short listed for the 2018 Jill Vickers Prize by the Canadian Political Science Association. The following year, Bashevkin was awarded the ISA Bertha Lutz Prize by the International Studies Association.

Selected bibliography
 Women As Foreign Policy Leaders: National Security and Gender Politics in Superpower America (Oxford University Press, 2018)
 Women, Power, Politics: The Hidden Story of Canada's Unfinished Democracy (Oxford University Press, 2009)
 Tales of Two Cities: Women and Municipal Restructuring in London and Toronto (University of British Columbia Press, 2006)
 Welfare Hot Buttons: Women, Work and Social Policy Reform (University of Toronto Press and University of Pittsburgh Press, 2002)
 Women on the Defensive: Living Through Conservative Times (University of Chicago Press and University of Toronto Press, 1998)
 Toeing the Lines: Women and Party Politics in English Canada (2nd ed., Oxford University Press, 1993)
 True Patriot Love: The Politics of Canadian Nationalism (Oxford University Press, 1991)
 Toeing the Lines: Women and Party Politics in English Canada (University of Toronto Press, 1985)

References

Living people
1954 births
Place of birth missing (living people)
Canadian political scientists
Women political scientists
21st-century Canadian non-fiction writers
Canadian women non-fiction writers
21st-century Canadian women writers
Canadian women academics
Fellows of the Royal Society of Canada
Academic staff of the University of Toronto
York University alumni
University of Michigan alumni
Hampshire College alumni
Presidents of the Canadian Political Science Association